WinSingad is a Microsoft Windows based software for singing training.

Description
WinSingad is software for singing training. It started life as SINGAD, which stands for "SINGing Assessment and Development", running on a BBC Micro and it was designed for use in primary schools to develop and assess children's singing pitching skills.

It was later ported to the Atari range of computers  to take advantage of MIDI and more recently to Windows. SINGAD enabled the pitching strategies used by children to be explored and compared with adult singers  and its use for real-time visual feedback in singing training was beneficial.

WinSingad displays
WinSingad offers displays of:
 Input sound waveform against time
 Fundamental frequency against time
 Short-term spectrum
 Narrow band spectrogram
 Spectral ratio against time
 Vocal tract area
 Mean/min vocal tract area against time.

In addition, a web camera window is often placed on screen with the camera positioned at the singer's side to provide a side view to enable posture to be viewed. In effect, this is a 90 degree mirror which gives a clear indication of spine alignment.

Notes

References
 Howard, D.M., and Welch, G.F. (1989). "Microcomputer-based singing ability assessment and development", Applied Acoustics, 27, (2), 89-102.
 Howard, D.M., and Welch, G.F. (1993). "Visual displays for the assessment of vocal pitch matching development", Applied Acoustics, 39, 235-252.
 Howard, D.M., Brereton, J., Welch, G.F., Himonides, E., DeCosta, M., Williams, J., and Howard, A.W. (2007). "Are Real-Time Displays of Benefit in the Singing Studio? An Exploratory Study", Journal of Voice, 21, (1), 20-34.
 Howard, D.M., and Angus, J.A.S. (1998). "A comparison between singing pitching strategies of 8 to 11 year olds and trained adult singers", Logopedics Phoniatrics Vocology, 22, (4), 169-176.
 Welch, G.F., Howard, D.M., and Rush, C. (1989). "Real-time visual feedback in the development of vocal pitch accuracy in singing", Psychology of Music, 17, 146-157.

External links
Official Website
London Singing Academy

Windows multimedia software
Singing